Day shapes are mast head signals visually indicating the status of a vessel to other vessels on navigable waters during daylight hours whether making-way, anchored, or aground.  These signals consist of a set of simple geometric shapes—ball, cylinder, cone, and diamond—that are displayed, hung from a mast, in a prescribed manner to indicate a vessel's operational status; some of these signals may be somewhat involved.  The meanings of the shapes are defined by the International Regulations for Preventing Collisions at Sea (ColRegs).

The vertical distance between shapes is at least . Vessels of less than  length may use shapes of smaller size commensurate with the size of the vessel. Day shapes of standard and reduced sizes are both commercially available. Day shapes are commonly constructed from a light weight frame covered with fabric and are designed to be collapsible for ease of storage.

Day shapes are designed to correspond to the various navigation lights required to be shown at night, and are required to be complied with by day from sunrise to sunset.  The appropriate lights may also be displayed during the day at times of restricted visibility or other necessary circumstances. Vessels under 7 meters are generally not required to display day shapes even if they are required to display lights at night.  

A square black flag displayed over the ball may be used as a distress signal. 

Some of the most common signals are as follows:

See also
 International Maritime Organization
 International Regulations for Preventing Collisions at Sea
 Marine navigation lights
 US Coast Guard

References

External links
 United States Coast Guard, Navigation Center, Navigation Rules On-Line
 International Maritime Organization: COLREGS

International Maritime Organization
Law of the sea
Nonverbal communication